Michael Moohan (27 April 1899 – 7 February 1967) was a New Zealand politician of the Labour Party. Seldom known to anyone by anything other than "Mick", he was a major organizational figure in the Labour Party's early history and went on to become a significant politician in his own right as an MP and cabinet minister.

Biography

Early life
Moohan was born in Garrison, County Fermanagh, Ireland, in 1899, he was brought up in Manchester, England. He was apprenticed to the engineering trade. He served with the 2nd Division, Royal Engineers during World War I in France and then in the Army of Occupation, the Army of the Rhine. Returned to England where the land 'fit for heroes' didn't emerge and emigrated to New Zealand in 1922, where he joined the Labour Party. In 1923 he married Selina (Cely) Heyman who arrived from Manchester prior to his arrival; they had one son and four daughters.

After arriving in New Zealand Moohan found employment with the technical staff of the New Zealand Post and Telegraph Department and was stationed in Raetihi. There he became active in support of Labour in the Waimarino County. He was elected a member of the Ohakune Borough Council from 1932 to 1935, also serving as deputy mayor. After, leaving Waimarino for Auckland, he was elected vice-president and later as secretary of the Auckland Labour Representation Committee. He joined Labour's national office as an assistant secretary in 1937, and in 1940 was elected as Labour's national secretary-treasurer.

Member of Parliament

Moohan was elected the Member of Parliament for the new electorate of Petone in 1946 and served until 1967, when he died. He fought off deputy leader Walter Nash for the Labour nomination who indicated his preference for contesting the Petone seat after an electoral redistribution occurred which made his seat of Hutt more marginal.

Moohan was described by contemporaries as a colourful character and effective debater. Attributed to his Irish upbringing he was described as a versatile speaker who could infuse almost any speech with an entertaining and effective mixture of both 'banter and bite'. Closer colleagues however also noted his underhanded and expedient nature. Nash said of him "He [Moohan] was a sly fellow, oozing bonhomie, with an instinct for low politics."

From 1947 to 1949 he was Under-Secretary to the Prime Minister. He was appointed by Peter Fraser to oversee the government's post-war state housing scheme. In 1951 he was nominated to stand for the deputy leadership of the party, but he declined the nomination. Moohan was a critic of Nash's leadership and helped organise a leadership challenge against him in 1954, though in the event switched sides and voted for Nash due to the increasing unpopularity of a leadership change among party members.

During the intervening time he also served as the Labour Party's president between 1955 and 1960 and served as Labour's campaign manager in the successful .

He was both Minister of Railways and Postmaster-General and Minister of Telegraphs in the Second Labour Government from 1957 to 1960. As one of Labour's most experienced MPs Moohan naturally expected to be given a major ministerial portfolio. It was a surprise for many, and in particular himself, when he was allocated only two relatively innocuous postings. He was not even allocated a front bench seat and made no secret of his disappointment. In 1959 he travelled to Warsaw as a delegate to the International Parliamentary Union and then went to London to study developments in telephone cable and postal procedures. His main accomplishment was the construction of a state of the art rail ferry, the Aramoana, to operate across Cook Strait.

Despite his cabinet ranking, Moohan was one of a group of three Labour MPs (the others being Bill Fox and Frank Kitts) who were deeply critical of the decisions made in the "Black Budget". From then on he became the chief critic within the Labour Party of Arnold Nordmeyer the Minister of Finance and was involved in several political manoeuvres to block him from the leadership of the party.

However Nordmeyer eventually replaced Nash as leader and Moohan began agitating against the party leadership once again. Alongside Bill Fox and Warren Freer, he was one of the few senior Labour MPs who backed Norman Kirk's successful challenge to Nordmeyer in 1965. Kirk promoted him to the frontbench and he became a close confidant of Kirk's until his death.

Death
Moohan had been indifferent health and was absent from Parliament for seven weeks in July and August 1966 suffering from a throat complaint. He died at his home in Lower Hutt on 7 February 1967, aged 68, survived by his wife and five children. Coincidentally he died just hours apart from another previous Labour Party president James Roberts. He was buried at the Taitā Lawn Cemetery in Lower Hutt.

Moohan Rocket
On 16 February 1960 a special ministerial train dubbed the Moohan Rocket made a trip from Wellington to Auckland on the North Island Main Trunk, taking 11 hours and 45 minutes, or 2½ hours less than the steam-hauled Night Limited. As the train of a brake van, three first-class cars and a Ministerial car at the rear only weighed 147 tons, and was hauled by two DG class locomotives, the time was somewhat disappointing. The return trip two days later behind a single DA class locomotive was slightly quicker at 11 hours and 34 minutes, though the superior DA could not then run through the tunnels north of Wellington and the two DGs took over at Palmerston North. The train reflected Moohan's idea of a fast and comfortable intercity service later seen in the Silver Star and Silver Fern.

Notes

References

 Rail: The Great New Zealand Adventure by Roy Sinclair (1987, Grantham House Wellington)  (Moohan Rocket, page 82)

 Who's Who in New Zealand (1961, 7th edition)

|-

|-

|-

|-

1899 births
1967 deaths
People from County Fermanagh
British Army personnel of World War I
Irish emigrants to New Zealand (before 1923)
Local politicians in New Zealand
Deputy mayors of places in New Zealand
New Zealand Labour Party MPs
Members of the New Zealand House of Representatives
New Zealand MPs for Hutt Valley electorates
Members of the Cabinet of New Zealand
Burials at Taitā Lawn Cemetery
20th-century New Zealand politicians
Deaths from cancer in New Zealand
Royal Engineers soldiers